Tyler James Cloyd (born May 16, 1987) is an American former professional baseball pitcher. He played in Major League Baseball (MLB) for the Philadelphia Phillies, Seattle Mariners, and Miami Marlins and in the KBO League for the Samsung Lions.

Baseball career
Cloyd attended the University of Nebraska at Omaha, where he played college baseball for the Nebraska–Omaha Mavericks.

Philadelphia Phillies
The Phillies drafted Cloyd in the 18th round of the 2008 Major League Baseball draft. Though he was expected to begin the 2012 season with the Reading Phillies of the Class AA Eastern League, he was instead assigned to the Lehigh Valley IronPigs of the Class AAA International League due to the suspension of another pitcher. He pitched in the Triple-A All-Star Game and was named the International League Most Valuable Pitcher in 2012.

Cloyd made his major-league debut on August 29, 2012, replacing Cole Hamels, who was ill. Cloyd pitched six innings, allowing three runs on seven hits. Cloyd got his first MLB win vs. the Reds, giving up 1 run in 7 innings. Cloyd made 11 starts and 2 relief appearances for the Phillies in 2013, going 2–7 with a 6.56 ERA.

Cleveland Indians
On October 2, 2013, Cloyd was designated for assignment and claimed by the Cleveland Indians. To make room on the 40-man roster, lefty Clay Rapada was designated for assignment. The Indians then designated him for assignment on November 25. On December 2, Cloyd was non-tendered by the Indians, making him a free agent. He was re-signed to a minor league deal on December 13. On July 30, 2014, Cloyd threw a no hitter for the Columbus Clippers of the International League in a 13–0 win against the Louisville Bats.

The Indians released Cloyd on January 6, 2015.

Samsung Lions
On January 8, 2015, Cloyd signed with the Samsung Lions of the Korea Baseball Organization.

New York Yankees
On February 1, 2016, Cloyd signed a minor league contract with the New York Yankees. In May 2016, Cloyd underwent Tommy John surgery and missed nearly all of the 2016 season.

Somerset Patriots
On April 7, 2017, Cloyd signed with the Somerset Patriots of the Atlantic League of Professional Baseball.

Seattle Mariners
On May 11, 2017, Cloyd had his contract purchased by the Seattle Mariners and was assigned to the Triple-A Tacoma Rainiers. He was called up on June 2, but did not pitch until he appeared in relief against the Toronto Blue Jays on June 9. On June 21, 2017, Cloyd was designated for assignment. He elected free agency on November 6, 2017.

Miami Marlins
On January 12, 2018, Cloyd signed a minor league deal with the Miami Marlins. He had his contract purchased on April 8, 2018. Cloyd elected free agency on October 12, 2018.

Tampa Bay Rays
On February 11, 2019, Cloyd signed a minor league contract with the Tampa Bay Rays that included an invite to Spring Training. He was released on March 26, 2019.

Somerset Patriots (second stint)
On April 9, 2019, Cloyd signed with the Somerset Patriots of the Atlantic League of Professional Baseball.

Seattle Mariners (second stint)
On April 19, his contract was purchased by the Seattle Mariners, and he was assigned to the Triple-A Tacoma Rainiers. Cloyd was released on July 15, 2019.

Somerset Patriots (third stint)
On July 21, 2019, Cloyd signed with the Somerset Patriots of the Atlantic League of Professional Baseball. He became a free agent following the season.

On February 19, 2020, Cloyd signed with the Sioux City Explorers of the American Association of Independent Professional Baseball. However, the team was not selected by the league to compete in the condensed 2020 season due to the COVID-19 pandemic. Cloyd was not chosen by another team in the dispersal draft, and therefore became a free agent.

Personal life
Cloyd is a native of Bellevue, Nebraska. He and his wife Tonya married in 2010 and have three children (two daughters and a son).

References

External links

1987 births
Living people
Baseball players from Nebraska
Major League Baseball pitchers
Philadelphia Phillies players
Samsung Lions players
Seattle Mariners players
Miami Marlins players
Omaha Mavericks baseball players
Florida Complex League Phillies players
Williamsport Crosscutters players
Lakewood BlueClaws players
Clearwater Threshers players
Reading Phillies players
Lehigh Valley IronPigs players
Columbus Clippers players
Scranton/Wilkes-Barre RailRiders players
Somerset Patriots players
Tacoma Rainiers players
Everett AquaSox players
American expatriate baseball players in South Korea
Sportspeople from King County, Washington
People from Bellevue, Nebraska
Catholics from Washington (state)
Catholics from Nebraska